In psychology, the theory of attachment can be applied to adult relationships including friendships, emotional affairs, adult romantic and carnal relationships, and, in some cases, relationships with inanimate objects ("transitional objects"). Attachment theory, initially studied in the 1960s and 1970s primarily in the context of children and parents, was extended to adult relationships in the late 1980s. The working models of children found in Bowlby's attachment theory form a pattern of interaction likely to continue influencing adult relationships.

Four main styles of attachment have been identified in adults:
secure
anxious-preoccupied 
dismissive-avoidant
fearful-avoidant

Investigators have explored the organization and the stability of mental working models that underlie these attachment styles. They have also explored how attachment impacts relationship outcomes and how attachment functions in relationship dynamics.

Extending attachment theory
Mary Ainsworth and John Bowlby founded modern attachment theory on studies of children and their caregivers. Children and caregivers remained the primary focus of attachment theory for many years. In the 1980s, Sue Johnson began using attachment theory in adult therapy. Cindy Hazan and Phillip Shaver furthered research in attachment theory on adult relationships. Hazan and Shaver noticed that interactions between adults were similar to interactions between children and caregivers. For example, romantic or platonic partners desire to be close to one another, similar to how children desire to be close to their caregivers. Adults feel comforted when their attachments are present and anxious or lonely when they are absent. Romantic relationships, for example, serve as a secure base that helps people face the surprises, opportunities, and challenges life presents. Similarities such as these led Hazan and Shaver to extend attachment theory to adult relationships.

Relationships between adults differ in many ways from relationships between children and caregivers. The claim is not that these two kinds of relationships are identical, but rather that the core principles of attachment theory apply to both child-caregiver relationships and adult relationships.

Investigators tend to describe the core principles of attachment theory in light of their own theoretical interests. Their descriptions seem quite different on a superficial level. For example, Fraley and Shaver describe the "central propositions" of attachment in adults as follows:
 The emotional and behavioral dynamics of infant-caregiver relationships and adult relationships are governed by the same biological system.
 The kinds of individual differences observed in infant-caregiver relationships are similar to the ones observed in various close adult relationships.
 Individual differences in adult attachment behavior are reflections of the expectations and beliefs people have formed about themselves and their close relationships on the basis of their attachment histories; these "working models" are relatively stable and, as such, may be reflections of early caregiving experiences.
 Romantic love, as commonly conceived, involves the interplay of attachment, caregiving, and sex.

Compare this with the five "core propositions" of attachment theory listed by Rholes and Simpson:
 Although the basic impetus for the formation of attachment relationships is provided by biological factors, the bonds that children form with their caregivers are shaped by interpersonal experience.
 Experiences in earlier relationships create internal working models and attachment styles that systematically affect attachment relationships.
 The attachment orientations of adult caregivers influence the attachment bond their children have with them.
 Working models and attachment orientations are relatively stable over time, but they are not impervious to change.
 Some forms of psychological maladjustment and clinical disorders are attributable in part to the effects of insecure working models and attachment styles.

While these two lists clearly reflect the theoretical interests of the investigators who created them, a closer look reveals a number of shared themes. The shared themes claim that:
 People are biologically driven to form attachments with others, but the process of forming attachments is influenced by learning experiences.
 Individuals form different kinds of attachments depending on the expectations and beliefs they have about their relationships. These expectations and beliefs constitute internal "working models" used to guide relationship behaviors.
 Internal "working models" are relatively stable even though they can be influenced by experience.
 Individual differences in attachment can contribute positively or negatively to mental health and to the quality of relationships with others.

These themes could be described in a variety of ways and other themes could be added to the list. Regardless of how one describes the core principles of attachment theory, the key insight is that the same principles of attachment apply to close relationships throughout the lifespan. The principles of attachment in adult relationships are fundamentally the same as the principles of attachment between children and their caregivers. Some researchers, however, have criticized the theory of attachment in adult relationships and claim that adult attachment theory is simply an assumption that the principles of attachment during childhood continue to have an effect on an individual in adulthood.

Styles
Adults are described as having four attachment styles: 
 Secure
 Anxious-attachment/preoccupied
 Dismissive avoidant
 Fearful avoidant
The secure attachment style in adults corresponds to the secure attachment style in children. The anxious–preoccupied attachment style in adults corresponds to the anxious-ambivalent attachment style in children. However, the dismissive-avoidant attachment style and the fearful-avoidant attachment style, which are distinct in adults, correspond to a single-avoidant attachment style in children. The descriptions of adult attachment styles offered below are based on the relationship questionnaire devised by Bartholomew and Horowitz and on a review of studies by Pietromonaco and Barrett. Style and quality of attachment relationships can directly correlate with life satisfaction in adults. Average relationship duration can also be linked to the style of the relationship participants.

Many professionals, such as Sue Johnson, have developed several treatments for adults and couples using principles from Ainsworth and Bowlby's attachment theory. Treatments using attachment theory principles include traditional psychotherapy, cognitive psychotherapy, and emotionally focused couples therapy.

Secure

A secure attachment style is demonstrated by those possessing a positive view of self and a positive view of others.

Securely attached adults tend to agree with the following statements:

 "It is relatively easy for me to become emotionally close to others."
 "I am comfortable depending on others and having others depend on me."
 "I don't worry about being alone or others not accepting me."

This style of attachment usually results from a history of warm and responsive interactions with their attachments. Securely attached adults tend to have positive views of themselves, their attachments, and their relationships. Research evidence finds that a secure attachment style promotes a smooth transition from adolescence into emerging adulthood. They often report greater satisfaction and adjustment in their relationships than adults with other attachment styles. Securely attached adults feel comfortable both with intimacy and independence.

Secure attachment and adaptive functioning are promoted by a caregiver who is emotionally available and appropriately responsive to their child's attachment behavior, as well as capable of regulating both their positive and negative emotions.

Insecure

Anxious-preoccupied 
An anxious-preoccupied attachment style is demonstrated by those possessing a negative view of self and a positive view of others.

Adults with an anxious-preoccupied attachment type tend to agree with the following statements:

 I want to be completely emotionally intimate with others, but I often find that others are reluctant to get as close as I would like
 I am uncomfortable being without close relationships, but I sometimes worry that others don't value me as much as I value them.

Adults with this style of attachment seek high levels of intimacy, approval, and responsiveness from their attachment figure. They sometimes value intimacy to such an extent that they become overly dependent on the attachment figure. Compared to securely attached adults, adults who have anxious-preoccupied attachments tend to have less favorable views of themselves. They may feel a sense of anxiousness that only recedes when in contact with the attachment figure. They often doubt their worth as an individual and blame themselves for the attachment figure's lack of responsiveness. Adults who have an anxious-preoccupied style of attachment may exhibit high levels of emotional expressiveness, emotional dysregulation, worry, and impulsiveness in their relationships.

Dismissive-avoidant 

A dismissive-avoidant attachment style is demonstrated by those possessing a positive view of self and a negative view of others.

Adults with a dismissive style of avoidant attachment tend to agree with these statements:

 I am comfortable without close emotional relationships.
 It is important to me to feel independent and self-sufficient.
 I prefer not to depend on others or have others depend on me.

Adults with this attachment style desire a high level of independence. The desire for independence often appears as an attempt to avoid attachment altogether. They view themselves as self-sufficient and invulnerable to feelings associated with being closely attached to others. They often deny needing close relationships. Some may even view close relationships as relatively unimportant. They seek less intimacy with attachments, whom they often view less positively than they view themselves. Investigators commonly note the defensive character of this attachment style. Adults with a dismissive-avoidant attachment style tend to suppress and hide their feelings, and they tend to deal with rejection by distancing themselves from the sources of rejection (e.g. their attachments or relationships). While these individuals tend to suppress their feelings and may appear unaffected by their emotions, research indicates that they still have strong physiological reactions to emotionally-laden situations and content.

Fearful-avoidant 
Fearful-avoidant attachment patterns of behavior are demonstrated by those possessing an unstable or fluctuating view of self and others.

People with losses or other trauma, such as abuse in childhood and adolescence, may develop this type of attachment and tend to agree with the following statements:

 I am somewhat uncomfortable getting close to others. 
 I want emotionally close relationships, but I find it difficult to completely trust others, or to depend on them. 
 I sometimes worry that I will be hurt if I allow myself to become too close to other people.

They tend to feel uncomfortable with emotional closeness. These feelings are combined with sometimes unconscious, negative views about themselves and their attachments. They commonly view themselves as unworthy of responsiveness from their attachments and often do not trust the intentions of their attachments. Similar to the dismissive-avoidant attachment style, adults with a fearful-avoidant attachment style seek less intimacy from attachments and frequently suppress and/or deny their feelings. Because of this, they are much less comfortable expressing affection.

Studies have shown that individuals with an insecure attachment style may also be more vulnerable to mental health problems such as depression and anxiety disorders in addition to the challenge of developing healthy attachments in adulthood. Another study has shown that an individual's attachment style will affect their self-esteem as an adult.

Working models
Bowlby observed that children learn from their interactions with caregivers. Throughout many interactions, children form expectations about the accessibility and helpfulness of their caregivers. These expectations reflect children's thoughts about themselves and their caregivers:

Children's thoughts about their caregivers, together with thoughts about how deserving they are of good care from their caregivers, form working models of attachment. Working models help guide behavior by allowing children to anticipate and plan for caregiver responses. Bowlby theorized that once formed,  working models remain relatively stable. Children usually interpret experiences in the light of their working models, rather than change their working models to fit new experiences. However, when experiences cannot be interpreted in the light of their working models children may then modify their working models.

When Hazen and Shaver extended attachment theory to romantic relationships in adults, they also included the idea of working models. Research into adult working models has focused on two issues. First, how are the thoughts that form working models organized in the mind? Second, how stable are working models across time? These questions are briefly discussed below.

Organization of working models
Bartholomew and Horowitz have proposed that working models consist of two parts. One part deals with thoughts about the self and the other deals with thoughts about others. They further propose that a person's thoughts about themselves are either generally positive or generally negative. The same applies to a person's thoughts about others. To test these proposals, Bartholomew and Horowitz have looked at the relationship between attachment styles, self-esteem, and sociability. The diagram below shows the relationships they observed:

The secure and dismissive attachment styles are associated with higher self-esteem compared with the anxious and fearful attachment styles. This corresponds to the distinction between positive and negative thoughts about the self in working models. The secure and anxious attachment styles are associated with higher sociability than the dismissive or fearful attachment styles. This corresponds to the distinction between positive and negative thoughts about others in working models. These results suggested working models indeed contain two distinct domains—thoughts about self and thoughts about others—and that each domain can be characterized as generally positive or generally negative.

Baldwin and colleagues have applied the theory of relational schemas to working models of attachment. Relational schemas contain information about the way the attachment figures regularly interact with each other. For each pattern of interaction that regularly occurs between partners, a relational schema is formed that contains the following:
 information about the self
 information about the attachment
 information about the way the interaction usually unfolds.

For example, if a person regularly asks his or her partner for a hug or kiss, and the partner regularly responds with a hug or kiss, the person forms a relational schema representing the predictable interaction. The schema contains information about the self (e.g., "I need lots of physical affection"), it contains information about the partner (e.g., "My partner is an affectionate person"), and it contains information about the way the interaction usually unfolds. This information can be summarized as an if-then statement (e.g., "If I ask my partner for a hug or kiss, then my partner will respond with a hug or kiss and comfort me"). Relational schemas help guide behavior in relationships by allowing people to anticipate and plan for partner responses.

Baldwin and colleagues have proposed that working models of attachment are composed of relational schemas. The fact that relational schemas contain information about the self and information about others is consistent with previous conceptions of working models. The unique contribution of relational schemas to working models is the information about the way interactions with attachments usually unfold. Relational schemas add the if-then statements about interactions to working models. To demonstrate that working models are organized as relational schemas, Baldwin and colleagues created a set of written scenarios that described interactions dealing with trust, dependency, and closeness. For example, the scenarios for closeness included:
 You want to spend more time with your attachment.
 You reach out to hug or kiss your partner.
 You tell your attachment how deeply you feel for them.

Following each scenario, people were presented with two options about how their attachments might respond. One option was they "accept you;" the other option was they "reject you." Participants were then asked to rate the likelihood of each response on a seven-point scale. Ratings of likely attachment responses corresponded to people's attachment styles. Adults with secure attachment styles were more likely to expect accepting responses from their attachments. Their relational schema for the third closeness scenario would be, "If I tell my partner how deeply I feel for them, then my partner will accept me." Adults with other attachment styles were less likely to expect accepting responses from their attachments. Their relational schema for the third closeness scenario would be, "If I tell my partner how deeply I feel for them, then my attachment will reject me." Differences in attachment styles reflected differences in relational schemas. Relational schemas may therefore be used to understand the organization of working models of attachment, as has been demonstrated in subsequent studies.

The relational schemas involved in working models are likely organized into a hierarchy. According to Baldwin:

The highest level of the hierarchy contains very general relational schemas that apply to all relationships. The next level of the hierarchy contains relational schemas that apply to particular relationships. The lowest level of the hierarchy contains relationship schemas that apply to specific relationships.

Several theorists have proposed a hierarchical organization of working models. Pietromonaco and Barrett note:

Every hierarchy for working models includes both general working models (higher in the hierarchy) and relationship-specific working models (lower in the hierarchy). Studies have supported the existence of both general working models and relationship-specific working models. People can report a general attachment style when asked to do so, and the majority of their relationships are consistent with their general attachment style. A general attachment style indicates a general working model that applies to many relationships. Yet, people also report different styles of attachment to their friends, parents, and lovers. Relationship-specific attachment styles indicate relationship-specific working models. Evidence that general working models and relationship-specific working models are organized into a hierarchy comes from a study by Overall, Fletcher, and Friesen.

In summary, the mental working models that underlie attachment styles appear to contain information about self and information about others organized into relational schemas. The relational schemas are themselves organized into a three-tier hierarchy. The highest level of the hierarchy contains relational schemas for a general working model that applies to all relationships. The middle level of the hierarchy contains relational schemas for working models that apply to different types of relationships (e.g., friends, parents, lovers). The lowest level of the hierarchy contains relational schemas for working models of specific relationships.

Stability of working models
Investigators study the stability of working models by looking at the stability of attachment styles. Attachment styles reflect the thoughts and expectations that constitute working models. Changes in attachment styles, therefore, indicate changes in working models.

Around 70–80% of people experience no significant changes in attachment styles over time. The fact that attachment styles do not change for a majority of people indicates working models are relatively stable. Yet, around 20–30% of people do experience changes in attachment styles. These changes can occur over periods of weeks or months. The number of people who experience changes in attachment styles, and the short periods over which the changes occur, suggest working models are not rigid personality traits.

Why attachment styles change is not well understood. Waters, Weinfield and Hamilton propose that negative life experiences often cause changes in attachment styles. Their proposal is supported by evidence that people who experience negative life events also tend to experience changes in attachment styles. Davila, Karney, and Bradbury have identified four sets of factors that might cause changes in attachment styles: (a) situational events and circumstances, (b) changes in relational schemas, (c) personality variables, and (d) combinations of personality variables and situational events. They conducted a study to see which set of factors best explained changes in attachment styles. The study found that all four sets of factors cause changes in attachment styles. Changes in attachment styles are complex and depend on multiple factors.

Relationship outcomes
Adult relationships vary in their outcomes. The participants of some relationships express more satisfaction than the participants of other relationships, and there is a question of whether attachment influences the satisfaction and duration of relationships.

Satisfaction
Several studies have linked attachment styles to relationship satisfaction. Adults who have a secure attachment style usually express greater satisfaction with their relationships. Adults with insecure (anxious or avoidant) attachment styles tend to have lower satisfaction and commitment within their relationships.

Although the link between attachment styles and marital satisfaction has been firmly established, the mechanisms by which attachment styles influence marital satisfaction remain poorly understood. One mechanism may be communication. Secure attachment styles may lead to more constructive communication and more intimate self-disclosures, which in turn increase relationship satisfaction. Other mechanisms by which attachment styles may influence relationship satisfaction include emotional expressiveness, strategies for coping with conflict, and perceived support from partners. Further studies are needed to better understand how attachment styles influence relationship satisfaction.

Duration
Some studies suggest that adults with a secure attachment style have longer-lasting relationships. This may be partly due to commitment. Adults with a secure attachment style tend to express more commitment to their relationships. Adults with a secure attachment style also tend to be more satisfied with their relationships, which may encourage them to stay in their relationships longer. However, having a secure attachment style is by no means a guarantee of long-lasting relationships. Relationship participants with anxious and avoidant attachment styles have been linked to a decreased level of commitment.

Nor are secure attachment styles the only attachment styles associated with stable relationships. Adults with the anxious–preoccupied attachment style often find themselves in long-lasting, but unhappy, relationships. Anxious–preoccupied attachment styles often involve anxiety about being abandoned and doubts about one's worth in a relationship. These kinds of feelings and thoughts may lead people to stay in unhappy relationships.

Relationship dynamics
Attachment plays a role in the way actors interact with one another. A few examples include the role of attachment in affect regulation, support, intimacy, and jealousy. These examples are briefly discussed below. Attachment also plays a role in many interactions not discussed in this article, such as conflict, communication, and sexuality.

Affect regulation
Bowlby, in studies with children, observed that certain kinds of events trigger anxiety and that people try to relieve their anxiety by seeking closeness and comfort from caregivers. Three main sets of conditions trigger anxiety in children:
 Conditions of the child (fatigue, hunger, illness, pain, cold, etc.)
 Conditions involving the caregiver (caregiver absent, caregiver departing, caregiver discouraging proximity, caregiver giving attention to another child, etc.)
 Conditions of the environment (alarming events, criticism, or rejection by others)

The anxiety triggered by these conditions motivates the individuals to engage in behaviors that bring them physically closer to caregivers. A similar dynamic occurs in adults in relationships where others care about them. Conditions involving personal well-being, conditions involving a relationship partner, and conditions involving the environment can trigger anxiety in adults. Adults try to alleviate their anxiety by seeking physical and psychological closeness to their partners.

Mikulincer, Shaver, and Pereg have developed a model for this dynamic. According to the model, when people experience anxiety, they try to reduce their anxiety by seeking closeness with relationship partners. However, the partners may accept or reject requests for greater closeness. This leads people to adopt different strategies for reducing anxiety. People engage in three main strategies to reduce anxiety.

The first strategy is called the security-based strategy. The diagram below shows the sequence of events in the security-based strategy.

A person perceives something that provokes anxiety. The person tries to reduce anxiety by seeking physical or psychological closeness to their attachment. The attachment responds positively to the request for closeness, which reaffirms a sense of security and reduces anxiety. The person returns to their everyday activities.

The second strategy is called the hyperactivation, or anxiety attachment, strategy. The diagram below shows the sequence of events in the hyperactivation strategy.

The events begin the same way. Something provokes anxiety in a person, who then tries to reduce anxiety by seeking physical or psychological closeness to their attachment. The attachment rebuffs the request for greater closeness. The lack of responsiveness increases feelings of insecurity and anxiety. The person then gets locked into a cycle with the attachment: the person tries to get closer, the attachment rejects the request for greater closeness, which leads the person to try even harder to get closer, followed by another rejection from the attachment, and so on. The cycle ends only when the situation shifts to a security-based strategy (because the attachment finally responds positively) or when the person switches to an attachment-avoidant strategy (because the person gives up on getting a positive response from the attachment).

The third strategy is called the attachment avoidance strategy. The following diagram shows the sequence of events in the attachment avoidance strategy.

The events begin the same way as the security-based strategy. A person perceives something that triggers anxiety, and the person tries to reduce anxiety by seeking physical or psychological closeness to their attachment. But the attachment is either unavailable or rebuffs the request for closeness. The lack of responsiveness fuels insecurity and heightens anxiety. The person gives up on getting a positive response from the attachment, suppresses their anxiety, and distances themself from the attachment.

Mikulincer, Shaver, and Pereg contend these strategies for regulating attachment anxiety have very different consequences. The security-based strategy leads to more positive thoughts, such as more positive explanations of why others behave in a particular way and more positive memories about people and events. More positive thoughts can encourage more creative responses to difficult problems or distressing situations. The hyperactivation and attachment avoidance strategies lead to more negative thoughts and less creativity in handling problems and stressful situations. It is notable that the security-based strategy is contingent on a positive response from their attachment. From this perspective, it would benefit people to have attachments who are willing and able to respond positively to the person's request for closeness, so that they can use security-based strategies for dealing with their anxiety.

Support
People feel less anxious when close to their attachments because their attachments can provide support during difficult situations. Support includes the comfort, assistance, and information people receive from their attachments.

Attachment influences both the perception of support from others and the tendency to seek support from others. Adults in relationships with a partner who responds consistently and positively to requests for closeness tend to have secure attachments, and in return, they seek more support, while adults in relationships with a partner who typically is inconsistent in reacting positively or regularly reject requests for support tend to have another attachment style. Adults with a secure attachment style may trust their attachments to provide support because their attachments have reliably offered support in the past and may be more likely to ask for support when needed. Adults with insecure attachment styles often do not have a history of supportive responses from their attachments. They may rely less on their attachments and be less likely to ask for support when needed, though there may be other factors involved, as well.

Changes in the way people perceive attachment tend to occur with changes in the way people perceive support. One study looked at college students' perceptions of attachment to their mothers, fathers, same-sex friends, and opposite-sex friends and found that when students reported changes in attachment for a particular relationship, they usually reported changes in support for that relationship as well. Changes in attachment for one relationship did not affect the perception of support in other relationships. The link between changes in attachment and changes in support was relationship-specific.

Intimacy
Attachment theory has always recognized the importance of intimacy. Bowlby writes:

The desire for intimacy has biological roots and, in the great majority of people, persists from birth until death. The desire for intimacy also has important implications for attachment. Relationships that frequently satisfy the desire for intimacy lead to more secure attachments. Relationships that rarely satisfy the desire for intimacy lead to less secure attachments.

Collins and Feeney have examined the relationship between attachment and intimacy in detail. They define intimacy as a special set of interactions in which a person discloses something important about themselves, and their attachment responds to the disclosure in a way that makes the person feel validated, understood, and cared for. These interactions usually involve verbal self-disclosure, but can also involve non-verbal forms of self-expression such as touching, hugging, kissing, and sexual behavior. From this perspective, intimacy requires the following:
 willingness to disclose one's true thoughts, feelings, wishes, and fears
 willingness to rely on an attachment for care and emotional support
 willingness to engage in physical intimacy in the case of romantic or potential romantic partners

Collins and Feeney reviewed a number of studies showing how each attachment style relates to the willingness to self-disclose, the willingness to rely on partners, and the willingness to engage in physical intimacy. The secure attachment style is generally related to more self-disclosure, more reliance on partners, and more physical intimacy than other attachment styles. However, the amount of intimacy in a relationship can vary due to personality variables and situational circumstances, and so each attachment style may function to adapt an individual to the particular context of intimacy in which they live.

Mashek and Sherman report some findings on the desire for less closeness with partners. Sometimes too much intimacy can be suffocating. People in this situation desire less closeness with their partners. On one hand, the relationship between attachment styles and the desire for less closeness is predictable. People who have fearful-avoidant and anxious-preoccupied attachment styles typically want greater closeness with their partners. People who have dismissive–avoidant attachment styles typically want less closeness with their partners. On the other hand, the relatively large numbers of people who admit to wanting less closeness with their partners (up to 57% in some studies) far outnumber the people who have dismissive-avoidant attachment styles. This suggests people who have secure, anxious–preoccupied, or fearful-avoidant attachment styles sometimes seek less closeness with their partners. The desire for less closeness is not determined by attachment styles alone.

Jealousy

Jealousy refers to the thoughts, feelings, and behaviors that occur when a person believes a valued relationship is threatened by a rival. A jealous person experiences anxiety about maintaining support, intimacy, and other valued qualities of their relationship. Given that attachment relates to anxiety regulation, support, and intimacy, as discussed above, it is not surprising that attachment also relates to jealousy.

Bowlby observed that attachment behaviors in children can be triggered by the presence of a rival:

When children see a rival contending for a caregiver's attention, the children try to get close to the caregiver and capture the caregiver's attention. Attempts to get close to the caregiver and capture the caregiver's attention indicate the attachment system has been activated. But the presence of a rival also provokes jealousy in children. The jealousy provoked by a sibling rival has been described in detail. Recent studies have shown that a rival can provoke jealousy at very young ages. The presence of a rival can provoke jealousy in infants as young as six months old. Attachment and jealousy can both be triggered in children by the presence of a rival.

Attachment and jealousy can be triggered by the same perceptual cues in adults, too. The absence of the attachment can trigger both a need for close proximity and jealousy when people believe the attachment is spending time with a rival. The presence of a rival can also trigger a greater need for attachment and jealousy.

Differences in attachment styles influence both the frequency and the pattern of jealous expressions. People who have anxious–preoccupied or fearful-avoidant attachment styles experience jealousy more often and view rivals as more threatening than people who have secure attachment styles. People with different attachment styles also express jealousy in different ways. One study found that:

A subsequent study has confirmed that people with different attachment styles experience and express jealousy in qualitatively different ways. Attachment thus plays an important role in jealous interactions by influencing the frequency and the manner in which attachments express jealousy.

After love
After the dissolution of important romantic relationships, people usually go through separation anxiety and grieving. Grief is a process that leads to the acceptance of loss and usually allows the person to move on. During this process, people use different strategies to cope. Securely attached individuals tend to look for support, the most effective coping strategy. Avoidantly attached individuals tend to devalue the relationship and withdraw. Anxiously attached individuals are more likely to use emotionally focused coping strategies and pay more attention to the experienced distress. After the end of a relationship, securely attached individuals tend to have less negative overall emotional experiences than insecurely attached individuals.

The anxious and avoidant attachment has been found to predict interpersonal electronic surveillance (i.e., "Facebook stalking"). Such behavior is positively correlated with commitment, which in turn is correlated with attachment (anxious positively and avoidant negatively). As such, internet surveillance of former partners is closely related to attachment. However, IES and distress can function as a feedback loop, wherein increased surveillance increases distress and vice versa. Though used as a coping mechanism toward distress, it can in fact increase distress in the anxiously attached.

See also 

 Dynamic-maturational model of attachment and adaptation
 Counterdependency
 Human bonding
 Emotionally focused therapy
 Jean Piaget
 Traumatic bonding
 Monogamy
 Pair bonding
 Attachment parenting
 Term of endearment

References

Bibliography

External links 
 Levine, A, & Heller, R. "What Attachment Theory Can Teach about Love and Relationships – The surprising secrets to finding the right partner for a healthy relationship" Scientific American, December 29, 2010

Attachment theory
Evolutionary psychology
Human development
Interpersonal relationships
Love